Richard V. Reeves (born 4 July 1969) is a British American writer and scholar and a Senior Fellow at the Brookings Institution and director of the Future of the Middle Class Initiative.

Early life
Reeves was born in Peterborough, United Kingdom.

Career
In summer 2010 Reeves left Demos, joining the office of Deputy Prime Minister Nick Clegg, a Liberal Democrat, as a Special Advisor.  In 2012 Reeves urged the Liberal Democrats to choose to become a radical centrist political party, "a hard-driving radical liberal party of the political centre", continuing his campaign for centre left Liberal Democrats to leave, "Any attempt to position the Liberal Democrats as a party of the centre left after five years of austerity government in partnership with the Conservatives will be laughed out of court by the voters – and rightly so. Anybody who wants a centre-left party will find a perfectly acceptable one in Labour. The Liberal Democrats need centrist voters, "soft Tories", ex-Blairites, greens".

Until 2012 Reeves was Director of Strategy to Deputy Prime Minister Nick Clegg. Previously he had been director of the London-based think tank Demos.  Reeves has held positions including Director of Futures at The Work Foundation, a British non-profit organisation, Society Editor of The Observer, Economics Correspondent and Washington Correspondent of The Guardian, and policy adviser to Frank Field when he was Minister for Welfare Reform.

Reeves is Director of the Future of the Middle Class Initiative at Brookings, working principally on issues related to intergenerational mobility, inequality and social change. In 2014, he published a Brookings Essay, Saving Horatio Alger, along with a video in which he used Lego bricks to illustrate levels of social mobility in the U.S. In May 2014, he appeared in a Daily Show segment satirizing how the complaints about the plight of the poorer members of the top 1% distracts from solutions to social mobility.

Reeves has published four books, including John Stuart Mill: Victorian Firebrand (2007), a biography of the British liberal philosopher and politician, Happy Mondays (2002) about job satisfaction, and Of Boys And Men (2022) why the modern male is struggling, why it matters, and what to do about it. He co-authored The 80 Minute MBA (2009) with John Knell, a condensed business management book.

Reeves appears regularly on radio and television as a political commentator, and writes for a variety of publications including The New York Times, The Atlantic, The Guardian and The Observer. He is also a regular contributor to the online 'Think Tank' section of The Wall Street Journal. In 2005, he co-presented the four-part BBC2 series, Making Slough Happy. He writes regularly in British newspapers and magazines on politics, well-being, work and character. In 2008 he argued in The Guardian that social-liberals [a majority of Lib Dem members] should not be involved with the Liberal Democrats, but the Labour Party.

In June 2017, Reeves published a widely circulated New York Times op-ed, "Stop Pretending You're Not Rich". Reeves's 2017 book is Dream Hoarders: How the American Upper Middle Class Is Leaving Everyone Else in the Dust, Why That Is a Problem, and What to Do about It.

On September 22, 2022, he released the book Of Boys and Men: Why the Modern Male Is Struggling, Why It Matters, and What to Do about It.

Personal life
Reeves is a dual UK-US citizen, having been naturalized in October 2017 as a US citizen. He lives in the U.S. state of Maryland.

References

External links

British male journalists
British reporters and correspondents
British non-fiction writers
Institute directors
Living people
Liberal Democrats (UK) officials
Radical centrist writers
Nick Clegg
1969 births
People from Peterborough
English emigrants to the United States
Naturalized citizens of the United States
English expatriates in the United States
People from Maryland